The women's 100 metre freestyle S8 event at the 2012 Paralympic Games took place on 6 September, at the London Aquatics Centre.

Three heats were held, two with six swimmers each and one with seven competitors. The swimmers with the eight fastest times advanced to the final.

Heats

Heat 1

Heat 2

Heat 3

Final

References

Swimming at the 2012 Summer Paralympics
2012 in women's swimming